The first USS Pike (SS-6) was a  in the service of the United States Navy, later renamed as A-5.

She was laid down on 10 December 1900 at San Francisco, California by Union Iron Works, launched on 14 January 1903, and commissioned on 28 May 1903 at the Mare Island Navy Yard with Lieutenant Arthur MacArthur III in command.

Pike operated out of the Mare Island Navy Yard for over three years, operating principally in experimental and training roles. Following the earthquake and subsequent fire at San Francisco on 18 April 1906, members of Pike's crew took part in the relief efforts in the wake of the disaster.

Decommissioned on 28 November 1906, Pike remained inactive until 8 June 1908, when she was recommissioned for local operations with the Pacific Torpedo Flotilla, off the Pacific coast. She remained attached to this unit into June 1912. Pike was renamed A-5 on 17 November 1911.

A-5 arrived at the Puget Sound Navy Yard on 26 June 1912, and was placed in reserve two days later. Following two and a half years of inactivity there, A-5 was loaded onto the collier  on 15 February 1915 (her sister-ship A-3 was loaded the next day). A-5 made the voyage to the Philippines as deck cargo. She arrived at Olongapo on 26 March. Launched on 13 April, she was recommissioned on 17 April and assigned to the Asiatic Fleet.

Shortly after the United States entered World War I, A-5 sank while moored at the Cavite Navy Yard on 15 April 1917; her sinking was attributed to a slow leak in a main ballast tank. She was raised on 19 April and, following reconditioning, returned to active service. Like her sister-ships, she patrolled the waters off the entrance to Manila Bay during the course of the war with the Central Powers.

A-5, given the alphanumeric hull number SS-6 on 17 July 1920, was decommissioned on 25 July 1921. Earmarked as a target vessel, she was struck from the Naval Vessel Register on 16 January 1922.

References

Bibliography

 

Plunger-class submarines
Pike
Ships built in San Francisco
1903 ships
Maritime incidents in 1917
United States submarine accidents
Ships sunk as targets
Ships built by Union Iron Works